In order to facilitate organized, determined, and principled opposition to the wars, people have often founded anti-war organizations. These groups range from temporary coalitions which address one war or pending war, to more permanent structured organizations which work to end the concept of war and the factors which lead to large-scale destructive conflicts. The overwhelming majority do so in a nonviolent manner. The following list of anti-war organizations highlights past and present anti-war groups from around the world.

International 
 Beyond War
 Christian Peacemaker Teams
 Dartmouth Conferences
 Hands Off the People of Iran
 Institute for Economics & Peace
 International Campaign Against Aggression on Iraq
 International Campaign to Abolish Nuclear Weapons
 International Campaign to Ban Landmines
 International Fellowship of Reconciliation
 International Peace Bureau
 International Physicians for the Prevention of Nuclear War
 Mondpaca Esperantista Movado World Peace Esperanto Movement
 Nobel Women's Initiative organized by female Nobel Peace Prize winners
 Nonviolent Peaceforce
 Peace One Day
 Peace Brigades International
 Pugwash Conferences on Science and World Affairs
 Students for Justice in Palestine
 The Non-Violence Project
 War Resisters' International
 World Beyond War
 World Peace Council
 Women's International League for Peace and Freedom
 World Congress of Intellectuals for Peace
 Round Square

Africa 
 Anti-War Coalition
 Committee on South African War Resistance
 End Conscription Campaign
 Koeberg Alert

Asia 
 Beheiren
 Peace Now
 National Council for Peace

Europe 
 Czech National Social Party – Austria-Hungary, main altimilitarist party during the World War in 1914–1918
 Dansk Fredsforening, Danske Kvinders Fredskæde – Denmark
 German Peace Society
 Peace People (Ireland)
 International League of Peace
 League of Peace and Freedom
 Norwegian Peace Association (Norwegian: Norges Fredslag)
 Società per la pace e la giustizia internazionale – Italy
 Soviet Peace Committee – state-controlled organization during the Soviet Union
 Stop the War Committee – opposed the Second Boer war
 Swedish Peace and Arbitration Society
 VOS - Vlaamse Vredesvereniging – Flemish Peace Association, created in the trenches of Flanders during the Great War

France
 Movement for a Non-violent Alternative (in French)
 Peace Through Law Association
 Union pacifiste de France (in French)
 Groupe d'action et de résistance à la militarisation (in French)
 Mouvement pour le désarmement, la paix et la liberté (in French)

United Kingdom
 Campaign for Nuclear Disarmament
 Committee of 100
 Direct Action Committee
 International Voluntary Service
 Military Families Against the War
 No-Conscription Fellowship
 Peace Pledge Union
 Peace Society
 Stop the War Coalition
 Spies for Peace

North America

United States 

 About Face (formerly Iraq Veterans Against the War)
America First Committee – opposed American entry into the Second World War
 American League Against War and Fascism
 American Peace Mobilization
 American Peace Society
 A.N.S.W.E.R. (also known as International ANSWER and ANSWER Coalition)
 Another Mother For Peace
 Anti-War Committee
 Antiwar.com
 Buffalo Nine
 Campus Antiwar Network
 Committee for Non-Violent Action (later merged with the War Resisters League)
 Committee for Nonviolent Revolution
 Center on Conscience & War (formerly known as NISBCO)
 Central Committee for Conscientious Objectors
 Chicago Coalition Against War & Racism
 Council for a Livable World
 Council for the National Interest
 Code Pink: Women for Peace
 Common Dreams
 ChildVoice International
 Direct Action to Stop the War
 Friends Committee on National Legislation
 GI Rights Network
 Gold Star Families for Peace
 Grandmothers for Peace
 Iraq Peace Action Coalition
 LewRockwell.com
 Long Island Alliance for Peaceful Alternatives
 Military Families Speak Out opposed to war in Iraq
 Mennonite Central Committee
 Moratorium to End the War in Vietnam
 National Campaign for a Peace Tax Fund
 National Coordinating Committee to End the War in Vietnam
 National Mobilization Committee to End the War in Vietnam
 National War Tax Resistance Coordinating Committee
 New York Peace Society – first peace society in U.S., opposed 19th and 20th century wars
 No Conscription League
 Not in Our Name
 Orange County Student Alliance
 Peace Action
 Peace Alliance
 Peace and Freedom Party
 People's Coalition for Peace and Justice
 People's Council of America for Democracy and Peace – anti-World War I group
 Port Militarization Resistance
 Quincy Institute for Responsible Statecraft
 RESIST
 Ron Paul Institute for Peace and Prosperity
 Seneca Women's Encampment for a Future of Peace and Justice
 September Eleventh Families for Peaceful Tomorrows
 Spring Mobilization Committee to End the War in Vietnam
 Students for a Democratic Society (2006 organization)
 The World Can't Wait
 Troops Out Now Coalition
 United for Peace and Justice
 Veterans for Peace
 Vietnam Day Committee
 Vietnam Veterans Against the War
 War Resisters League
 Win Without War
 Women's Peace Party
Women's Peace Society
Women's Peace Union
Youth International Party (Yippies)

Canada 
 American Deserters Committee
 Canadian Peace Alliance
 Canadian Peace Congress
 Ceasefire Canada
 Nova Scotia Voice of Women
 War Resisters Support Campaign

Oceania 
 Global Peace and Justice Auckland
 Peace Action Wellington
 Stop the War Coalition

Religious

Christian 
 American Friends Service Committee
 Anglican Pacifist Fellowship
 Catholic Association for International Peace
 Catholic Worker Movement
 Christian Peace Conference
 Episcopal Peace Fellowship
 Fellowship of Reconciliation
 Friends Committee on National Legislation
 Lutheran Peace Fellowship
 Mennonite Central Committee
 Methodist Peace Fellowship
 Order of Maximilian – anti-Vietnam war organization
 Pax Christi
 Pentecostals & Charismatics for Peace & Justice
 Presbyterian Peace Fellowship

Buddhist 
 Buddhist Peace Fellowship

See also
List of peace activists
Anti-nuclear organizations
Anti-war movement
Direct action
Gandhi Peace Award
Gandhi Peace Prize
 GI Coffeehouses
 GI Underground Press
Global Peace Index
Nobel Peace Prize laureates
Non-interventionism
Nonviolence
Nonviolent resistance
Nuclear disarmament
Pacifism
Parliament Square Peace Campaign
Peace
Peace churches
Resistance movement
White House Peace Vigil
World peace

References

Further reading

External links

Anti-war